Fürstenfeldbruck is an electoral constituency (German: Wahlkreis) represented in the Bundestag. It elects one member via first-past-the-post voting. Under the current constituency numbering system, it is designated as constituency 215. It is located in southern Bavaria, comprising the districts of Dachau and Fürstenfeldbruck.

Fürstenfeldbruck was created for the inaugural 1949 federal election. Since 2017, it has been represented by Katrin Staffler of the Christian Social Union (CSU).

Geography
Fürstenfeldbruck is located in southern Bavaria. As of the 2021 federal election, it comprises the district of Dachau and the entirety of the Fürstenfeldbruck district excluding the municipality of Germering.

History
Fürstenfeldbruck was created in 1949. In the 1949 election, it was Bavaria constituency 2 in the numbering system. In the 1953 through 1961 elections, it was number 197. In the 1965 through 1972 elections, it was number 201. In the 1976 election, it was number 202. In the 1980 through 1998 elections, it was number 201. In the 2002 and 2005 elections, it was number 217. In the 2009 and 2013 elections, it was number 216. Since the 2017 election, it has been number 215.

Originally, the constituency comprised the independent city of Landsberg am Lech and the districts of Fürstenfeldbruck, Dachau, and Landkreis Landsberg am Lech. In the 1976 election, it comprised the districts of Fürstenfeldbruck, Dachau, and Landsberg. In the 1980 through 2009 elections, it comprised the districts of Fürstenfeldbruck and Dachau. In the 2013 election, it lost the municipality of Petershausen from the Dachau district. In the 2017 election, it regained Petershausen while losing Germering from the Fürstenfeldbruck district.

Members
The constituency has been held continuously by the Christian Social Union (CSU) since its creation. It was first represented by Richard Jaeger from 1949 to 1980, a total of eight consecutive terms. He was succeeded by Eicke Götz from 1980 to 1990. Gerda Hasselfeldt was then representative from 1990 to 2017, a total of seven consecutive terms. Katrin Staffler was elected in 2017 and re-elected in 2021.

Election results

2021 election

2017 election

2013 election

2009 election

Notes

References

Federal electoral districts in Bavaria
1949 establishments in West Germany
Constituencies established in 1949
Fürstenfeldbruck (district)
Dachau (district)